The Myanmar Badminton Federation is the badminton organization of Myanmar. It was founded in the late 1950s and later on it became a member of the Badminton World Federation and the Badminton Asia Confederation. The MBF's main court is located in 320/332, Anawrahta Street West Gymnasium, Lanmadaw Township, Yangon, Myanmar.

References

External links
https://web.archive.org/web/20091214071429/http://www.mosports.gov.mm/fedrations.htm
http://www.bwfbadminton.org/file_download.aspx?id=32139
http://www.myanmartradepublication.com/myanmartrade/EDU_Detailinfo2.asp?show=4681

National members of the Badminton World Federation
Badminton in Myanmar
Badminton
1950s establishments in Burma